Matthias Casse (born 19 February 1997) is a Belgian judoka who won the bronze medal at the 2020 Summer Olympics. 

In 2017, Matthias Casse became junior world champion in Zagreb, the first Belgian male judoka to achieve this since Johan Laats in 1986. That same year, he won his first judo Grand Prix medal at senior level, winning a bronze medal in the Hague. In 2019 he won the gold medal at the European Games (this also was the European judo championship) and at the Judo World Masters. After having won the Paris Grand Slam in 2020 he became the no. 1 on the world ranking in his category. In June 2021, he became the first Belgian male judo world champion at the senior level by winning the gold at the 2021 World Judo Championships in Budapest, Hungary.

References

External links
 
 
 

Belgian male judoka
1997 births
Living people
People from Mortsel
Olympic judoka of Belgium
Judoka at the 2019 European Games
European Games medalists in judo
European Games gold medalists for Belgium
World judo champions
Judoka at the 2020 Summer Olympics
Olympic medalists in judo
Olympic bronze medalists for Belgium
Medalists at the 2020 Summer Olympics
Sportspeople from Antwerp Province
21st-century Belgian people